The 2011 Aegon Classic was a women's tennis tournament played on outdoor grass courts. It was the 30th edition of the event. It took place at the Edgbaston Priory Club in Birmingham, United Kingdom, originally scheduled for 6–12 June 2011, but the final was rescheduled to 13 June 2011 due to rain. Unseeded Sabine Lisicki won the singles title.

Entrants

Seeds 

1 Rankings as of 23 May 2011

Other entrants 
The following players received wildcards into the main draw:
  Ana Ivanovic
  Samantha Murray
  Melanie South
  Emily Webley-Smith

The following players received entry from the qualifying draw:
  Shuko Aoyama
  Naomi Broady
  Rika Fujiwara
  Sarah Gronert
  Conny Perrin
  Arina Rodionova
  Alexandra Stevenson
  Ajla Tomljanović

Withdrawals 
  Maria Sharapova (illness)
  Marion Bartoli (injury)

Finals

Singles 

 Sabine Lisicki defeated  Daniela Hantuchová 6–3, 6–2
 It was Lisicki's first WTA title of the year and second of her career.

Doubles 

 Olga Govortsova /  Alla Kudryavtseva defeated  Sara Errani /  Roberta Vinci 1–6, 6–1, [10–5]

References 

 Entry list

External links 
 

Aegon Classic
Aegon Classic
Aegon Classic
Birmingham Classic (tennis)
Birm